The Four Seasons Hotel San Francisco at Embarcadero is a luxury hotel that occupies the top 11 floors of 48 story office tower of 345 California Center at 222 Sansome Street in the financial district of San Francisco, California. Initially planned as condominiums, the twin towers of hotel were situated at 45-degree angles relative to the rest of the building, connected to each other by several glass skybridges that offer views of the San Francisco Bay Area. 

The hotel opened in 1986 as the Mandarin Oriental, San Francisco. In February 2015, the hotel was sold to Loews Hotels and renamed the Loews Regency San Francisco. In May 2019, Loews sold the hotel to investment company Westbrook Partners. The hotel closed for renovations at the end of 2019, and the Four Seasons Hotels group assumed management, renaming it "Four Seasons Hotel San Francisco at Embarcadero" (although the Embarcadero runs several blocks away from the building). The hotel was originally set to reopen on May 1, 2020, but the outbreak of the COVID-19 pandemic forced the opening to be postponed to October 1, 2020,. As the pandemic quickly worsened, the newly-opened hotel soon closed again, on December 20, 2020. It reopened on June 16, 2021.

Gallery

See also
List of tallest buildings in San Francisco

References

Further reading

External links

 Four Seasons Hotel San Francisco at Embarcadero official website

Financial District, San Francisco
Skyscraper hotels in San Francisco
Hotels established in 1986
Hotel buildings completed in 1986